Euxoa distinguenda is a moth of the family Noctuidae. It is found in central, southern and eastern Europe, Turkey, Lebanon, Israel, Jordan and western Asia.

Description
Warren states E. distinguenda Led. (= aquilina Bsd. non Hbn., hastifera Donz. fig. 2 only) (5f). Exceedingly 
like aquilina, but the male has the antennae clothed with long fascicles of cilia; claviform stigma large, outlined in black: hindwing white. Found in S. France. Switzerland and Hungary: originally recorded from the Altai Mts. in W. Siberia.

Subspecies
Euxoa distinguenda distinguenda (Alps)
Euxoa distinguenda distincta (eastern Europe, Levant)

Biology
Adults are on wing from September to October. There is one generation per year.

The larvae feed on various herbaceous plants.

References

External links
 Noctuinae of Israel

Euxoa
Moths of Europe
Moths of Asia
Moths of the Middle East
Moths described in 1857